Otte akkorder is a 1944 Danish family film directed by Johan Jacobsen and starring Erling Schroeder.

Cast

 Erling Schroeder - Georg
 Asbjørn Andersen - Johannes
 Buster Larsen - Bud
 Peter Malberg - Spillelærer Jørgensen
 Hans-Henrik Krause - Spilleelev
 Bodil Kjer - Ellen
 Gunnar Lauring - Poul
 Poul Reumert - Jørgen Svane
 Katy Valentin - Agnes Svane
 Poul Reichhardt - Aksel Henriksen
 Charles Wilken - Thomas
 Petrine Sonne - Kogekone Elisabeth Sørensen
 Inge Hvid-Møller - Gertrud Iversen
 Eyvind Johan-Svendsen - Apotekeren
 Ebbe Rode - Manfred Thomsen
 Randi Michelsen - Emmy Knudsen
 Helle Virkner - Grethe
 Henry Nielsen - Pantelåner
 Anna Henriques-Nielsen - Fru Petersen
 Ib Schønberg - Direktør Steensen
 Elith Pio - Viggo Jensen
 Johannes Meyer - Værtshusholder Hansen
 Olaf Ussing - Bartender
 Poul Thomsen - Værtshusgæst

References

External links

1944 films
1944 drama films
1940s Danish-language films
Danish black-and-white films
Films directed by Johan Jacobsen
Danish drama films